Patrick Wayne Durham (born March 10, 1967) is a retired American professional basketball player who played in the National Basketball Association (NBA) and several other top professional leagues. He was selected by the Dallas Mavericks in the second round (35th overall) of the 1989 NBA draft.

Durham played two years in the NBA for the Golden State Warriors and Minnesota Timberwolves. His best year as a pro came during the 1994–95 season as a member of the Timberwolves, appearing in 59 games and averaging 5.1 ppg. Durham played collegiately at Colorado State University.

Durham also played professionally in Europe.  In 1997, he was with Nancy, and he played for STB Le Havre in France for the 2005–06 season.

References

External links
Pat Durham NBA statistics, basketballreference.com

1967 births
Living people
African-American basketball players
ALM Évreux Basket players
American expatriate basketball people in Argentina
American expatriate basketball people in France
American expatriate basketball people in Greece
American expatriate basketball people in the Philippines
American expatriate basketball people in Spain
American expatriate basketball people in Switzerland
American expatriate basketball people in Turkey
American men's basketball players
Apollon Patras B.C. players
Basketball players from Dallas
Cedar Rapids Silver Bullets players
Colorado State Rams men's basketball players
Dallas Mavericks draft picks
Élan Béarnais players
Fargo-Moorhead Fever players
Galatasaray S.K. (men's basketball) players
Golden State Warriors players
Greek Basket League players
La Crosse Catbirds players
Liga ACB players
Minnesota Timberwolves players
Olimpia de Venado Tuerto basketball players
Philippine Basketball Association imports
Rapid City Thrillers players
Real Betis Baloncesto players
San Miguel Beermen players
Saski Baskonia players
SLUC Nancy Basket players
Small forwards
STB Le Havre players
Valencia Basket players
21st-century African-American people
20th-century African-American sportspeople